Iqbal Hossain (born 7 July 1975) is a Bangladeshi retired professional footballer who played as a defensive midfielder. He spent his club career playing for Dhaka League giants Abahani Limited Dhaka and Brothers Union. Iqbal was also part of the 1999 South Asian Games winning Bangladesh team. He is currently the team manager (team leader) of the Bangladesh national football team, under Javier Cabrera.

International career

Bangladesh national team
Iqbal was a key player in the Bangladesh team, for coach Samir Shaker. Iqbal was known as a very skilled and hardworking footballer in his playing life. He first came into the national team limelight during the 1999 SAFF Gold Cup, were Bangladesh reached the final, only to suffer a 1–0 defeat against India. During the 1999 South Asian Game, he had to face three dope tests during the tournament, which Bangladesh ended up winning. According to Iqbal, one of the team's players were usually selected by lottery for a dope test and unfortunately for him, he was selected for test three times during the tournament, both before the semi finals and final. He also stated that even after the nations victory in the final, against hosts Nepal, the officials asked for him to attend another dope test.

After retirement

Bangladesh Football Federation
After retirement Iqbal won the BFF elections in 2012 and 2016 as an executive member. He was also in charge of managing the Bangladesh national team during 2015 SAFF Championship in India, and also during the 2015 Bangabandhu Cup which was held in Dhaka.

On 14 March 2021, He was named the team Manager for the Bangladesh under Jamie Day for the 2021 Three Nations Cup, held in Nepal.

On 9 March 2022, the Bangladesh Football Federation reappointed Iqbal as the Bangladesh team manager under new coach Javier Cabrera.

References

Living people
1975 births
Bangladeshi footballers
Bangladesh international footballers
Abahani Limited (Dhaka) players
Brothers Union players
Muktijoddha Sangsad KC players
Association football midfielders